Karar (Turkish: Decision) is a daily newspaper published in Turkey since 7 March 2016.

The newspaper, of which editor-in-chief is İbrahim Kiras, was first published as an e-newspaper on 28 April 2015, by a group of journalists who left Akşam and Star newspapers.

References

External links
  

Publications established in 2015
Daily newspapers published in Turkey
Turkish-language newspapers
Newspapers published in Istanbul
2015 establishments in Turkey